Pranav is an Indian name meaning Om, a sacred sound and symbol. According to Hindu mythology, Pranav is said to be the power of Brahma, Vishnu and Shiva combined. It can also be referred to as Om, which is a very simple sound with a complex meaning. It is the whole universe coalesced into a single word, representing the union of mind, body, and spirit that is at the heart of yoga.

Pranav is also one of the names of Lord Vishnu, the 409th Name as per the Vishnu Sahasra Nama.

Notable people with the name include:
 Pranav Chopra (born 1992), Indian badminton player
 Pranav Dhanawade (born 2000), Indian schoolboy cricketer
 Pranav Gupta (born 1993), Indian cricketer 
 Pranav Mistry (born 1981), Indian computer scientist
 Pranav Mohanlal, Indian actor
 Pranav Sivakumar, American speller
 Pranav Singh, Indian politician
 Pranab Mukherjee, Former Indian president

References

Indian masculine given names
Hindu given names